Mélodie Daoust (born January 7, 1992) is a Canadian ice hockey player. She has competed with the Canadian national team in numerous international tournaments and won a gold medal at the 2014 Winter Olympics, a silver medal at the 2018 Winter Olympics and a gold medal at the 2022 winter Olympics. Daoust is a member-player of the PWHPA and has been featured in many of the organization’s showcases, including the Elite Women’s 3-on-3 hockey game at the Skills Competition of the 2020 NHL All-Star Game.

Playing career
In 2008–09, she played with the Lac St. Louis Selects and helped them accumulate a 62–0–2 record. Daoust was a Montreal Canadiens scholarship holder in 2010 from the Quebec Foundation for Athletic Excellence. With the Collège Édouard-Montpetit Lynx, she helped lead them to a Quebec collegiate championship in 2009–10. In addition, she won the league scoring title with 24 goals and 31 assists for 55 total points. She accomplished this in only 13 games played.

In participating with the Canada women's national under-18 ice hockey team, Daoust registered 10 goals and 23 points in 13 games. At the 2010 IIHF world U-18 championships, she scored a goal and adding an assist in the gold medal game. The following day, she flew back to Montreal to help the Lynx capture the collegiate championship. She scored twice and added an assist in the championship game, including the game-winner in a 6–5 win versus Dragons du Collège Laflèche. She had helped the Lynx accumulate a won-loss record of 44 wins, compared to 3 losses.

CWHL
She was called up as an emergency fill-in with the Montreal Stars, and scored three points in her CWHL debut on January 8 (versus the Burlington Barracudas).

CIS

On February 10, 2011, Daoust signed a letter of intent to play for the McGill Martlets women's ice hockey program. She refused offers from numerous Canadian and American universities, including Cornell, Dartmouth and a full scholarship from Boston University. Daoust was only one of five female student-athletes committed to McGill University in the fall of 2011 that were athletic scholarship recipients (announced by the Quebec Foundation for Athletic Excellence).

In the aftermath of the 2012–13 season, Daoust was named to the CIS First Team All-Canadians. Among the other players named as First Team All-Canadians were Katelyn Gosling and Hayley Wickenheiser.

Hockey Canada
Daoust was part of Canada women's national under-18 ice hockey team that won a gold medal at the 2010 IIHF World Women's Under-18 Championship in Chicago. As a member of the gold medal-winning squad, a hockey card of her was featured in the Upper Deck 2010 World of Sports card series. In addition, she participated in the Canada Celebrates Event on June 30 in Edmonton, Alberta which recognized the Canadian Olympic and World hockey champions from the 2009–10 season. On October 3, 2011, she was named to the Team Canada roster that participated in the 2011 4 Nations Cup. She scored her first international goal on February 17 at the 2014 Sochi Olympics against Switzerland and they won the gold medal.

On January 11, 2022, Daoust was named to Canada's 2022 Olympic team.

Career statistics

Regular season and playoffs

International

Awards and honours
Most Valuable Player at the 2018 Olympics - Ice hockey at the 2018 Winter Olympics – Women's tournament
2009–10 Ligue de hockey féminin collégial AA scoring champion
Canadian Interuniversity Sport (CIS) Rookie of the Year (Tissot Award) (2011–12) et second star team
Most valuable player at the McGill University women's hockey awards gala
CIS women's hockey Player of the Year (Brodrick Trophy), 2012–2013)
2013 RSEQ scoring champion
2012-13 USports First Team All-Star
Among four finalists for the CIS BLG Awards 2013 Athlete of the Year (Jim Thompson Trophy)
2015-16 U Sports First Team All-Canadian
2016-17 RSEQ MOST OUTSTANDING PLAYER
2016-17 RSEQ First Team All-Stars

Personal life 
Daoust is a lesbian. She came out in 2013 and married her longtime partner, Audrey St-Germain, in 2019. The couple have one son, Mathéo.

References

External links

1992 births
Canadian women's ice hockey forwards
French Quebecers
Ice hockey people from Quebec
Ice hockey players at the 2014 Winter Olympics
Ice hockey players at the 2018 Winter Olympics
Ice hockey players at the 2022 Winter Olympics
Les Canadiennes de Montreal players
Living people
McGill Martlets ice hockey players
Medalists at the 2014 Winter Olympics
Medalists at the 2018 Winter Olympics
Medalists at the 2022 Winter Olympics
Olympic ice hockey players of Canada
Olympic gold medalists for Canada
Olympic medalists in ice hockey
Olympic silver medalists for Canada
Sportspeople from Salaberry-de-Valleyfield
Professional Women's Hockey Players Association players
Canadian LGBT sportspeople
LGBT ice hockey players
Lesbian sportswomen